Calephelis muticum, the swamp metalmark, is a butterfly species in the family Riodinidae.

Description
Males have pointed forewings while the females tend to be slightly more rounded. Both sexes have bright red-brown wings which are lightly checkered. Wingspan is 2.4 to 3 cm.

Distribution
They have populations in the United States in southern Michigan, Ohio, Missouri, southern Wisconsin and northern Arkansas. There are also small populations in Iowa and Kentucky. They are most often seen in bogs, marshes, swamps and wet meadows.  The species is endangered in Illinois.

Life cycle
The eggs are laid singly on the underside of the host plant. Fourth and fifth stage caterpillars overwinter. In the Great Lakes region there is only one brood between June and August, while in the southern regions there are two broods between May and September.

Larval foods
Cirsium muticum
Cirsium altissimum

Nectar flowers
Rudbeckia hirta

Conservation
Calephelis muticum is threatened by ongoing loss and degradation of habitat, invasive species, and pesticides.

References

Butterflies of North America
Riodinini
Butterflies described in 1937